Milan Direct was an Australian-based furniture company  that is now sold as a private label under the Temple & Webster brand. The company was founded in 2006 and operates primarily through an online marketplace. 

Milan Direct was bought by online retailer Temple & Webster in 2015 for $20 million, and is traded under TPW on the ASX.

Overview
Milan Direct was founded in 2006 by Ruslan Kogan and Dean Ramler. Previously, Kogan had launched an online electronics retail business, and Ramler's family has had a history of furniture design and production. The company sells both modern and retro furniture and uses a direct to consumer distribution method. 

By 2010, the company had a revenue of $5.3 million and was named to the BRW Fast Starters list. In 2011, Milan Direct generated $6.7 million in revenue and $12.6 million in 2012.

In November 2015, Temple & Webster acquired Milan Direct ahead of its IPO. In 2016, Milan Direct opened its first brick and mortar retail location in Richmond, Victoria. In December 2016, Temple & Webster absorbed Milan Direct, shut down its website and began selling its products from the Temple & Webster website as a private collection.

References

External links
Official Website
Designer Furniture
Bedroom Furniture

Furniture retailers of Australia
2006 establishments in Australia